Gilbert Mutandiro (born 6 April 1984) is a male Zimbabwean long-distance runner. He competed in the marathon event at the 2015 World Championships in Athletics in Beijing, China.

See also
 Zimbabwe at the 2015 World Championships in Athletics

References

External links

1984 births
Living people
Zimbabwean male long-distance runners
Place of birth missing (living people)
World Athletics Championships athletes for Zimbabwe